Thomas M. Kron (February 28, 1943 – November 29, 2007) was an American former professional basketball player. A 6ft 5in guard, Kron, played his rookie season (1966–1967) with the St. Louis Hawks. He was drafted by the Seattle SuperSonics in the 1967 Expansion draft and spent two seasons there, and finished his career with the Kentucky Colonels of the American Basketball Association, becoming a fan favorite during the 1969 and 1970 seasons.

High school career
Kron played for the legendary Orlando "Gunner" Wyman at Tell City High School (Tell City, Indiana); he led the Marksmen to 4 Sectional and 3 Regional titles; during his junior season (1960–61), he led them to the Indiana Final Four.  The Marksmen lost their semi-final matchup to the Indianapolis Manual Redskins, starring the Van Arsdale Twins, Dick Van Arsdale and Tom Van Arsdale.  He was named All-State and an Indiana All-Star in 1962.  Kron was inducted into the Indiana Basketball Hall of Fame in 2001.

College career
Kron played college basketball at the University of Kentucky under legendary coach Adolph Rupp; he was a member of 2 SEC championship teams (1963-64 & 1965-66). As a senior member of Rupp's Runts during the 1965–1966 season, he led Kentucky to the NCAA Championship Finals versus UTEP, playing alongside such All-Americans as Pat Riley, Thad Jaracz and Louie Dampier.

Upon graduation from Kentucky, Kron had scored 719 points, grabbed 500 rebounds, and dished out 134 assists. In 1964–65 he was named both First Team All-Southeastern Conference by the coaches and Third Team by the AP. In 1965–66, he was named Third Team All-Southeastern Conference by the UPI.

Professional career
In 1966, the St. Louis Hawks made him their 3rd round pick; as a rookie, he averaged 2.1 points per game off the bench.  He then moved to Seattle, following the 1967 NBA Expansion Draft, as a member of the SuperSonics and spent the next two seasons (1967–68 and 1968–69) coming off the bench and averaging 9.7 and 5.1 respectively. He then moved to the ABA rejoining his Kentucky teammate Louie Dampier in leading the Colonels to the playoffs.

Death
Tommy Kron died of bladder cancer at age 64 on November 29, 2007. He is interred at Cave Hill Cemetery in Louisville, Kentucky.

References

External links
   @  basketball-reference.com
   @  hoopshall.com
 

1943 births
2007 deaths
American men's basketball players
Basketball players from Indiana
Deaths from bladder cancer
Kentucky Colonels players
Kentucky Wildcats men's basketball players
People from Tell City, Indiana
Seattle SuperSonics expansion draft picks
Seattle SuperSonics players
Shooting guards
Sportspeople from Owensboro, Kentucky
St. Louis Hawks draft picks
St. Louis Hawks players
Deaths from cancer in Kentucky
Burials at Cave Hill Cemetery